Rookies (aka Red, White and Blue) is a 1927 American silent comedy film directed by Sam Wood and released by Metro-Goldwyn-Mayer. The film pairs the comedy teaming of Karl Dane and George K. Arthur as the stars of Rookies. Because of the popularity of this film, this would be the first of several collaborations between the two actors. The comedy team of "... gangly Karl Dane and diminutive George K. Arthur...  ... Clearly conceived to cash in on the success of Paramount's Wallace Beery-Raymond Hatton service comedy Behind the Front, this Dane-Arthur vehicle finds our mismatched heroes cast as a sergeant and private during WWI."

Plot
While flirting with dancer Zella Fay (Louise Lorraine) at a night club, Sergeant Diggs (Karl Dane), has taken an immediate dislike to Greg Lee (George K. Arthur), a cabaret dancer and Zella's partner. He dismisses Lee as a simpering dandy. Lee arrogantly tries to get even with the sergeant, and as a result, he is arrested and sent to an Army training camp instead of jail.

With World War I raging, now drafted as a private, Lee again finds himself pitted against tough Drill Sergeant Diggs. Private Lee does everything he can to annoy Sergeant Diggs, thinking it will get him thrown out of the Army.

At camp, Private Lee's life is made miserable by the constant badgering of Diggs, but he reciprocates in kind. Both men have their sights set on the pretty Betty Wayne (Marceline Day), the judge's daughter. The rivalry between the tough sergeant and bumbling recruit goes through many mishaps and missteps until it finally gets resolved.

The Army camp has reconnaissance balloons and, by accident, Diggs and Betty find themselves adrift in a runaway balloon. Lee sees a full complement of parachutes, and sets off in an aircraft to rescue Diggs and Betty.

Lee manages to pull off an aircraft-to-balloon jump, making sure that the two stranded accidental aerialists make it safely to the ground. This heroic feat thus proves his heroism and fortitude to his rival and Betty.

Cast

 Karl Dane as Sergeant Diggs
 George K. Arthur as Greg Lee
 Marceline Day as Betty Wayne
 Louise Lorraine as Zella Fay
 Frank Currier as The Judge
 E. H. Calvert as The Colonel
 Tom O'Brien as Sgt. O'Brien
 Charles Sullivan as Cpl. Sullivan
 Lincoln Stedman as Sleepy
 Gene Stone as Smarty

Production
According to the January 2, 1927 in Film Daily, director Sam Wood was starting production on Byron Morgan's story. Under the working title of Red, White and Blue, principal photography on Rookies began on January 3, 1927.

An impressive slate of crew members worked for the MGM production. The crew included: set designers Cedric Gibbons and David Townsend, Andre'-ani in costume design and Herbert I. Leeds (credited as Bert Levy) as title illustrator.

Reception
Despite the meagre budget in a B film, Rookies turned out to be a surprise box office hit. Film reviewer Hal Erickson, noted that Rookies, had a new comedy teaming, "After several hilarious if disjointed slapstick misadventures, the boys are set adrift in a reconnaissance balloon. There was hardly an original moment in 'Rookies', but that's not to say it wasn't funny. The film was an enormous box-office hit, spawning a series of equally well-received feature films starring Dane and Arthur."

Preservation
A copy of Rookies is preserved by MGM and a trailer is held by the Library of Congress (Government of the United States).

References

Notes

Citations

Bibliography

 Catalog of Holdings: The American Film Institute Collection and The United Artists Collection at the Library of Congress. Los Angeles: The American Film Institute, 1978. .
 Eames, John Douglas. The MGM Story: The Complete History Of Fifty Roaring Years. London: Octopus Books, 1975. .
 Farmer, James H. Celluloid Wings: The Impact of Movies on Aviation. Blue Ridge Summit, Pennsylvania: Tab Books Inc., 1984. .
 Wynne, H. Hugh. The Motion Picture Stunt Pilots and Hollywood's Classic Aviation Movies. Missoula, Montana: Pictorial Histories Publishing Co., 1987. .

External links

Lobby poster
Stills at silentfilmstillarchive.com

1927 films
1927 comedy films
American aviation films
Silent American comedy films
American silent feature films
American black-and-white films
Metro-Goldwyn-Mayer films
Military humor in film
American World War I films
Films directed by Sam Wood
1920s American films